The 1980–81 New York Rangers season was the franchise's 55th season. In the regular season, the Rangers finished in fourth place in the Patrick Division with 74 points and earned a berth in the playoffs. New York won series with the Los Angeles Kings and St. Louis Blues to reach the NHL semi-finals, where the team was defeated by the New York Islanders in a four-game sweep.

Regular season
Fred Shero, citing a drinking problem, chose to resign as coach. Craig Patrick, the Rangers' director of operations, replaced him. Craig Patrick became the third generation of the Patrick family to coach the Rangers, after Lester Patrick, Lynn Patrick and Muzz Patrick.

Halfway through the season, veteran Phil Esposito decided to retire. He retired after 18 seasons, the last six with the Rangers. He finished his career with 717 goals and 1,590 points.

Final standings

Schedule and results

|- align="center" bgcolor="#FFBBBB"
| 1 || 9 || @ Boston Bruins || 7–2 || 0–1–0
|- align="center" bgcolor="#CCFFCC"
| 2 || 11 || @ Toronto Maple Leafs || 8–3 || 1–1–0
|- align="center" bgcolor="#FFBBBB"
| 3 || 12 || Pittsburgh Penguins || 6–3 || 1–2–0
|- align="center" bgcolor="#FFBBBB"
| 4 || 15 || St. Louis Blues || 2–1 || 1–3–0
|- align="center" bgcolor="#FFBBBB"
| 5 || 18 || @ Washington Capitals || 8–2 || 1–4–0
|- align="center" bgcolor="#FFBBBB"
| 6 || 19 || Edmonton Oilers || 4–2 || 1–5–0
|- align="center" bgcolor="#CCFFCC"
| 7 || 22 || Vancouver Canucks || 3–2 || 2–5–0
|- align="center" bgcolor="#FFBBBB"
| 8 || 25 || @ Detroit Red Wings || 4–2 || 2–6–0
|- align="center" bgcolor="#CCFFCC"
| 9 || 26 || Detroit Red Wings || 7–6 || 3–6–0
|- align="center" bgcolor="#FFBBBB"
| 10 || 28 || @ St. Louis Blues || 5–4 || 3–7–0
|- align="center" bgcolor="white"
| 11 || 30 || @ Philadelphia Flyers || 3–3 || 3–7–1
|-

|- align="center" bgcolor="#FFBBBB"
| 12 || 1 || @ Montreal Canadiens || 7–4 || 3–8–1
|- align="center" bgcolor="#FFBBBB"
| 13 || 2 || Los Angeles Kings || 6–3 || 3–9–1
|- align="center" bgcolor="white"
| 14 || 5 || @ Chicago Black Hawks || 3–3 || 3–9–2
|- align="center" bgcolor="#FFBBBB"
| 15 || 8 || @ Vancouver Canucks || 6–4 || 3–10–2
|- align="center" bgcolor="#FFBBBB"
| 16 || 10 || @ Los Angeles Kings || 4–1 || 3–11–2
|- align="center" bgcolor="#FFBBBB"
| 17 || 11 || @ Calgary Flames || 7–3 || 3–12–2
|- align="center" bgcolor="white"
| 18 || 14 || Pittsburgh Penguins || 3–3 || 3–12–3
|- align="center" bgcolor="#CCFFCC"
| 19 || 16 || Hartford Whalers || 7–3 || 4–12–3
|- align="center" bgcolor="#FFBBBB"
| 20 || 19 || Philadelphia Flyers || 5–1 || 4–13–3
|- align="center" bgcolor="#FFBBBB"
| 21 || 22 || @ New York Islanders || 6–4 || 4–14–3
|- align="center" bgcolor="white"
| 22 || 23 || Vancouver Canucks || 2–2 || 4–14–4
|- align="center" bgcolor="#CCFFCC"
| 23 || 26 || Boston Bruins || 6–4 || 5–14–4
|- align="center" bgcolor="#CCFFCC"
| 24 || 29 || @ Pittsburgh Penguins || 4–2 || 6–14–4
|-

|- align="center" bgcolor="#FFBBBB"
| 25 || 1 || Minnesota North Stars || 5–3 || 6–15–4
|- align="center" bgcolor="#CCFFCC"
| 26 || 3 || @ Winnipeg Jets || 4–3 || 7–15–4
|- align="center" bgcolor="#CCFFCC"
| 27 || 5 || @ Edmonton Oilers || 5–1 || 8–15–4
|- align="center" bgcolor="#CCFFCC"
| 28 || 7 || Chicago Black Hawks || 5–4 || 9–15–4
|- align="center" bgcolor="#CCFFCC"
| 29 || 10 || Washington Capitals || 6–2 || 10–15–4
|- align="center" bgcolor="#CCFFCC"
| 30 || 12 || @ Colorado Rockies || 4–3 || 11–15–4
|- align="center" bgcolor="#FFBBBB"
| 31 || 14 || @ Chicago Black Hawks || 2–1 || 11–16–4
|- align="center" bgcolor="#CCFFCC"
| 32 || 17 || Winnipeg Jets || 8–2 || 12–16–4
|- align="center" bgcolor="white"
| 33 || 20 || @ Minnesota North Stars || 3–3 || 12–16–5
|- align="center" bgcolor="#FFBBBB"
| 34 || 22 || Calgary Flames || 3–2 || 12–17–5
|- align="center" bgcolor="#FFBBBB"
| 35 || 26 || @ Washington Capitals || 7–3 || 12–18–5
|- align="center" bgcolor="#FFBBBB"
| 36 || 28 || Montreal Canadiens || 5–2 || 12–19–5
|- align="center" bgcolor="#CCFFCC"
| 37 || 30 || @ Quebec Nordiques || 6–3 || 13–19–5
|- align="center" bgcolor="#FFBBBB"
| 38 || 31 || Colorado Rockies || 6–4 || 13–20–5
|-

|- align="center" bgcolor="#CCFFCC"
| 39 || 2 || New York Islanders || 3–1 || 14–20–5
|- align="center" bgcolor="white"
| 40 || 4 || Quebec Nordiques || 2–2 || 14–20–6
|- align="center" bgcolor="white"
| 41 || 9 || Buffalo Sabres || 3–3 || 14–20–7
|- align="center" bgcolor="#FFBBBB"
| 42 || 11 || Toronto Maple Leafs || 5–3 || 14–21–7
|- align="center" bgcolor="white"
| 43 || 13 || @ Calgary Flames || 4–4 || 14–21–8
|- align="center" bgcolor="#FFBBBB"
| 44 || 15 || @ Colorado Rockies || 4–3 || 14–22–8
|- align="center" bgcolor="#FFBBBB"
| 45 || 18 || @ Buffalo Sabres || 4–0 || 14–23–8
|- align="center" bgcolor="#CCFFCC"
| 46 || 19 || Calgary Flames || 6–3 || 15–23–8
|- align="center" bgcolor="#FFBBBB"
| 47 || 21 || @ Winnipeg Jets || 5–1 || 15–24–8
|- align="center" bgcolor="#CCFFCC"
| 48 || 23 || @ Edmonton Oilers || 7–4 || 16–24–8
|- align="center" bgcolor="#CCFFCC"
| 49 || 24 || @ Vancouver Canucks || 7–5 || 17–24–8
|- align="center" bgcolor="#CCFFCC"
| 50 || 28 || @ Los Angeles Kings || 6–2 || 18–24–8
|- align="center" bgcolor="#CCFFCC"
| 51 || 31 || @ Minnesota North Stars || 7–3 || 19–24–8
|-

|- align="center" bgcolor="#FFBBBB"
| 52 || 2 || Los Angeles Kings || 3–2 || 19–25–8
|- align="center" bgcolor="#CCFFCC"
| 53 || 4 || New York Islanders || 9–3 || 20–25–8
|- align="center" bgcolor="#FFBBBB"
| 54 || 5 || @ Boston Bruins || 6–3 || 20–26–8
|- align="center" bgcolor="white"
| 55 || 8 || Minnesota North Stars || 3–3 || 20–26–9
|- align="center" bgcolor="#CCFFCC"
| 56 || 12 || Winnipeg Jets || 8–6 || 21–26–9
|- align="center" bgcolor="#FFBBBB"
| 57 || 14 || @ Toronto Maple Leafs || 6–3 || 21–27–9
|- align="center" bgcolor="#FFBBBB"
| 58 || 15 || St. Louis Blues || 5–4 || 21–28–9
|- align="center" bgcolor="#CCFFCC"
| 59 || 18 || Toronto Maple Leafs || 8–3 || 22–28–9
|- align="center" bgcolor="#FFBBBB"
| 60 || 19 || @ Detroit Red Wings || 7–3 || 22–29–9
|- align="center" bgcolor="#CCFFCC"
| 61 || 21 || Washington Capitals || 6–4 || 23–29–9
|- align="center" bgcolor="#FFBBBB"
| 62 || 22 || @ Hartford Whalers || 6–5 || 23–30–9
|- align="center" bgcolor="#CCFFCC"
| 63 || 25 || Buffalo Sabres || 6–3 || 24–30–9
|- align="center" bgcolor="#FFBBBB"
| 64 || 28 || @ Pittsburgh Penguins || 6–4 || 24–31–9
|-

|- align="center" bgcolor="white"
| 65 || 1 || Montreal Canadiens || 4–4 || 24–31–10
|- align="center" bgcolor="white"
| 66 || 4 || Edmonton Oilers || 5–5 || 24–31–11
|- align="center" bgcolor="#FFBBBB"
| 67 || 7 || @ St. Louis Blues || 7–2 || 24–32–11
|- align="center" bgcolor="white"
| 68 || 8 || Detroit Red Wings || 4–4 || 24–32–12
|- align="center" bgcolor="#FFBBBB"
| 69 || 10 || @ Quebec Nordiques || 6–4 || 24–33–12
|- align="center" bgcolor="#FFBBBB"
| 70 || 11 || Colorado Rockies || 4–3 || 24–34–12
|- align="center" bgcolor="#CCFFCC"
| 71 || 14 || Hartford Whalers || 6–2 || 25–34–12
|- align="center" bgcolor="#CCFFCC"
| 72 || 18 || Boston Bruins || 3–2 || 26–34–12
|- align="center" bgcolor="#CCFFCC"
| 73 || 21 || @ Hartford Whalers || 6–4 || 27–34–12
|- align="center" bgcolor="white"
| 74 || 22 || Quebec Nordiques || 7–7 || 27–34–13
|- align="center" bgcolor="#FFBBBB"
| 75 || 25 || @ Buffalo Sabres || 4–2 || 27–35–13
|- align="center" bgcolor="#CCFFCC"
| 76 || 28 || @ Montreal Canadiens || 6–2 || 28–35–13
|- align="center" bgcolor="white"
| 77 || 30 || Philadelphia Flyers || 0–0 || 28–35–14
|-

|- align="center" bgcolor="#FFBBBB"
| 78 || 2 || @ New York Islanders || 2–1 || 28–36–14
|- align="center" bgcolor="#CCFFCC"
| 79 || 3 || Chicago Black Hawks || 3–1 || 29–36–14
|- align="center" bgcolor="#CCFFCC"
| 80 || 5 || @ Philadelphia Flyers || 2–0 || 30–36–14
|-

Playoffs

Key:  Win  Loss

Player statistics
Skaters

Goaltenders

†Denotes player spent time with another team before joining Rangers. Stats reflect time with Rangers only.
‡Traded mid-season. Stats reflect time with Rangers only.

Awards and records

Transactions

Draft picks
New York's picks at the 1980 NHL Entry Draft in Montreal, Quebec, Canada at the Montreal Forum.

Farm teams

References

Bibliography
 

New York Rangers seasons
New York Rangers
New York Rangers
New York Rangers
New York Rangers
1980s in Manhattan
Madison Square Garden